André Lima may refer to:

André Lima (footballer, born May 1985), Brazilian football striker
André Lima (environmentalist) (born 1971), Brazilian environmentalist, lawyer and writer
André Lima (futsal player) (born 1971), Portuguese futsal player and coach
André Lima (footballer, born January 1985), Brazilian football left-back